Leonid Akulinin (born 7 March 1993) is a Ukrainian football forward for German club FC Gießen.

Career
He was a member of the Ukraine national under-21 football team, where he was called-up first time by Serhiy Kovalets for Valeriy Lobanovskyi Memorial Tournament in 2013.

He was chosen best player of the 2014 Commonwealth of Independent States Cup.

References

External links

1993 births
Footballers from Donetsk
Living people
Ukrainian footballers
Ukraine youth international footballers
Ukraine under-21 international footballers
Association football forwards
FC Shakhtar-3 Donetsk players
FC Hoverla Uzhhorod players
Bohemians 1905 players
FK Sūduva Marijampolė players
FC Karpaty Lviv players
FC Arsenal Kyiv players
FK Fotbal Třinec players
FC Gießen players
Ukrainian Premier League players
Czech First League players
Czech National Football League players
A Lyga players
Oberliga (football) players
Ukrainian expatriate footballers
Expatriate footballers in the Czech Republic
Ukrainian expatriate sportspeople in the Czech Republic
Expatriate footballers in Lithuania
Ukrainian expatriate sportspeople in Lithuania
Expatriate footballers in Germany
Ukrainian expatriate sportspeople in Germany

| years10 = 2022–     | caps10 =  9 | goals10 = 3 | clubs10 = FC Gießen